Alpine Skiing at the 2012 Winter Youth Olympics was held at the Olympia Run Patscherkofel in Igls, Innsbruck, Austria from 14 to 22 January. The difference in the Youth Olympic program for alpine skiing compared to the Winter Olympics was that there were no downhill for both genders, and an inclusion of a team event.

Medal summary

Medal table

Events

Boys' events

Girls' events

Mixed events

Multi-medalists
Athlets who have won at least two medals.

Qualification system
Each nation could send a maximum of 4 athletes (2 boys and 2 girls). The top 7 teams at the 2011 Junior Alpine World Ski Championships in Crans-Montana, Switzerland, plus the hosts Austria were allowed to send the maximum of 4 athletes. The remaining spots were awarded to nations who score points in the Marc Holder Trophy at the said championships. Any remaining quota spots were distributed to nations not already qualified, with a maximum of one boy or girl from one nation. The quota limit was 115, but with reallocation each gender gets one more spot. The updated quota spots were released on December 12, 2011 and are subject to change.

Qualification summary

References

 
2012 in alpine skiing
2012 Winter Youth Olympics events
2012
Youth
Youth Olympics